Dimítrios Patsoukakis (Greek: Δημήτρης Πατσουκακης; born 18 March 1987) is a Greek athlete specialising in the pole vault. He won the bronze medal at the 2009 European U23 Championships.

His personal bests in the event are 5.62 metres outdoors (Athens 2014) and 5.60 metres indoors (Piraeus 2016).

Competition record

References

1987 births
Living people
Greek male pole vaulters
Athletes (track and field) at the 2013 Mediterranean Games
Mediterranean Games competitors for Greece
20th-century Greek people
21st-century Greek people